Slatina-Timiș is a commune in Caraș-Severin County, western Romania with a population of 3159 people. It is composed of four villages: Ilova (Illópatak), Sadova Nouă (Újszadova), Sadova Veche (Ószadova) and Slatina-Timiș.

References

Communes in Caraș-Severin County
Localities in Romanian Banat